Ian Johnson was a member of Donald Bradman's famous Australian cricket team, which toured England in 1948. Bradman's men went undefeated in their 34 matches; this unprecedented feat by a Test side touring England earned them the sobriquet The Invincibles.

An off spinner, Johnson was a member of Bradman's first-choice team, playing in four of the five Tests before being dropped for the final match. However, he was not prominent in the Tests, taking seven wickets at a bowling average of 61.00. Among the frontline bowlers who played in four or more Tests, Johnson had the worst average by a factor of almost two and took the fewest wickets. Johnson had little impact with the bat, scoring 51 runs at a batting average of 10.20, but took five catches in the slips.

Johnson had more success in the tour matches, taking 85 wickets at 18.37 in all first-class fixtures. This ranked him third among the Australians in the wicket-taking and fifth in the averages. He bowled more overs than everyone but Bill Johnston, allowing Bradman to ease the workload on pace spearheads Ray Lindwall and Keith Miller, and conserve their energy for the Tests. Johnson's most successful match with the ball was against Gloucestershire, in which he took match figures of 11/100. He was also more prolific with the bat outside the Tests, scoring 543 runs at 30.16, with a top-score of 113 not out against Somerset. He also made 80 against a Marylebone Cricket Club team that consisted almost entirely of Test players. Johnson was prominent in the field, taking 23 catches, the most by a non-wicket-keeper on tour.

Early tour
Australia traditionally fielded its first-choice team in the opening match of the tour, which was usually against Worcestershire. Johnson had been a regular member of the Australian Test team since World War II, and was selected in Bradman's full-strength team.

Worcestershire elected to bat first, and Johnson took 3/52 from 23 overs, the most bowled by any Australian, cleaning up the lower order as Australia removed the hosts for 233. When Australia batted, Johnson came in at No. 10 and made an unbeaten 12 as Australia declared their innings closed at 8/462. Australia dismissed the hosts for 212 to complete victory by an innings and 17 runs. Johnson took the last three wickets to end with 3/75 from 13.3 overs; he was the most uneconomical bowler among those who sent down more than 18 deliveries.

Johnson played a major role in the next match against Leicestershire. He made six at No. 8 as Australia batted first and scored 448. Johnson came on with the hosts at 3/74 and took two quick wickets in the space of five runs, beginning a collapse that led to Leicestershire being all out for 130. He ended with 2/50 from 23 overs. Australia enforced the follow on, and Johnson broke through their top and middle order. The hosts reached 0/45 before Johnson took the first five wickets to reduce them to 5/88. Leicestershire progressed to 5/113 before Johnson took two more wickets in the space of four balls. He ended with 7/42 from 21 overs, his best first-class innings figures, as the home team were dismissed for 147, handing Australia victory by an innings and 171 runs.

The Australians proceeded to play Yorkshire, on a damp pitch conducive to slower bowling. Johnson was rested as Australia came closest to losing a match for the whole tour. Australia were 6/31 in pursuit of 60 for victory, before scraping home by four wickets.

Johnson returned in the next match against Surrey at The Oval in London, where Australia won the toss and batted first. Batting at No. 6, Johnson came in at 4/444 and put on 99 runs with vice-captain and fellow South Melburnian Lindsay Hassett, before falling for 46; Australia were eventually bowled out for 632. Johnson then took five wickets to help cut down Surrey's first innings. The hosts reached 2/40 before Johnson claimed three middle order wickets to reduce them to 6/66. He later removed the final batsmen to end with 5/53 from 18.2 overs. Surrey were bowled out for 141 and forced to follow on and Johnson took 3/40 in the second innings as the home team made 195 to cede victory to Australia by an innings. Johnson removed captain Errol Holmes and Stuart Surridge in both innings.

Johnson was rested for the next match against Cambridge University, which Australia won by an innings. In the following match against Essex, Johnson returned as Australia won the toss and batted first and went on to score 721, a world record for the most number of first-class runs in one day's play. He came in at 6/664 and was unable to join in the high scoring, making only nine as the lower order folded quickly, none of the four bowlers reaching double figures. Australia subsequently proceeded to victory by an innings and 451 runs, their biggest winning margin for the tour. Johnson was not required to bowl in the first innings as the pacemen dismissed the hosts for 83 in 36.5 overs. In the second innings, Johnson was given an opportunity and took four of the first six wickets to fall, reducing Essex to 6/46. The home side added 131 for the next wicket before Johnson removed their captain and top-scorer Tom Pearce for 71; he added another wicket as Essex were out for 187. Johnson finished with 6/37 from 21 overs. Johnson was rested for the next match against Oxford University, which resulted in another innings victory.

The eighth match of the season was against the Marylebone Cricket Club at Lord's. The MCC fielded seven players who would represent England in the Tests, and were basically a full strength Test team, while Australia fielded their first-choice team. Having been a regular member of the Test team since the end of World War II, and having taken 29 wickets at 12.03 in his four games on tour, Johnson was selected along with fellow spinner Colin McCool, a leg spinner. This meant that Australia's first-choice team was the same as in the opening match against Worcestershire. Barring one change in the bowling department, the same team lined up for Australia in the First Test, with the top six batsmen in the same position. It was a chance for both sides to gain a psychological advantage over the players who would oppose them in the Tests. Australia won the toss and batted first and Johnson came in at 5/343 to join former South Melbourne and Victorian team-mate and fellow Royal Australian Air Force fighter pilot Keith Miller. The pair put on 165 before Miller fell on the second morning, quickly followed by Johnson at 8/512, trapped leg before wicket by off spinner Jim Laker for 80, but not before Johnson had hit him for three sixes. Bradman's men went on to amass 552. Johnson was the least successful and most uneconomical Australian in the first innings, taking 0/43 from 12 overs as the hosts made 189. Bradman enforced the follow on and Johnson had a better return on the second attempt. The hosts reached 3/128 when Johnson caused a middle-order collapse. He had New Zealand Test batsman Martin Donnelly stumped by Don Tallon, before trapping English Test batsman Len Hutton leg before wicket five runs later. He then removed Ken Cranston to leave the MCC at 6/159. Johnson ended with 3/37 and caught Denis Compton from the pace bowling of Ray Lindwall as Australia bowled out the home side for 205 to win by an innings.

The MCC match was followed by Australia's first non-victory of the tour, which against Lancashire. Johnson had little to do in the match. After the first day was washed out, he was promoted to No. 4 and made only five in the first innings. He took 0/16 from eight overs in the first innings and neither batted nor bowled in the second innings as the match ended in a draw.

In the following match against Nottinghamshire, Johnson took 1/26 and made a duck in the first innings as the hosts batted first. He claimed 3/78 in the second innings as the match was drawn. In the next game against Hampshire, Australia had another scare. On a drying pitch, Johnson took 2/35 as Australia removed the hosts for 195. He then made two as Australia were dismissed for 117, the first time they had conceded a first innings lead on the tour. In the second innings, he took 0/13 in four overs as Hassett's opening bowlers took all the wickets; Hampshire were bowled out for 103 to leave Australia a target of 182 in 175 minutes. Johnson was promoted to No. 3 and came to the crease almost immediately when Sid Barnes fell before Australia had scored. Johnson hit out, striking three sixes and seven fours, making 74 in the partnership of 105 with Bill Brown. Johnson fell for 74, but Hassett came in and guided Australia to an eight-wicket win without further loss. The final match before the First Test was against Sussex. Johnson was neither required to bowl nor bat in the first innings. The pacemen dismissed the hosts for 86 in 46.4 overs before Australia declared at 5/549 in reply. Johnson registered 0/37 from 11 overs as Sussex fell for 138 to seal another innings victory for Australia.

First Test 

Although his four matches since the MCC fixture had yielded only six wickets at 34.16, Johnson was selected in the team for the First Test at Trent Bridge. McCool, the other spinner in the MCC and Worcestershire matches, had played in only one match since the MCC game, in which he was wicketless. McCool's omission was the only change from those two matches. Bill Johnston, who bowled left arm pace and orthodox spin was included in the team at the last minute in the hope of exploiting a wet wicket, following the arrival of rain. Johnston had taken match figures of 10/40 and 11/117 against Yorkshire and Hampshire respectively, both on rain-affected wickets.

English captain Norman Yardley won the toss and elected to bat. Pundits believed the pitch would be ideal for batting after giving some assistance to the fast bowlers in the first hour. Australia's pacemen reduced England to 8/74 before finishing them off for 165. Johnson was only given five overs and took 0/19 as the pacemen efficiently cut down the English batsmen in 79 overs.

During the innings, Bill Edrich was on four when he edged Ray Lindwall to Johnson at first slip. Johnson got both hands to the ball above his head, but dropped it. However, the dropped catch was not costly, as Edrich was dismissed for 18.

On the third day, Australia reached 5/305 when Johnson came in to bat. He made 21 with three fours, including an edge over the slips cordon, before being bowled by Laker. Johnson hit the ball onto his foot, which deflected it back into his stumps. This left Australia at 6/338 but the lower order continued to contribute and pushed the total to 509, giving the tourists a 344-run lead.

England began their second innings on the third afternoon. Late in the day, after scoring 13 in 43 minutes, Edrich was caught behind by Don Tallon after attempting a cut shot from Johnson's bowling. Edrich did not read the arm ball, which went straight on and took the outside edge, leaving England at 2/39. Denis Compton came in and he ran down the pitch before the first ball was bowled; he had to quickly block the ball on the run. He then survived a confident lbw appeal from the bowling of Johnson when he was on eight. Compton appeared resigned to his fate and ready to walk, but umpire Frank Chester declined the appeal. During this passage of play, Johnson extracted a substantial amount of spin from the surface. England closed the day at 2/121.
 
The light was again poor on the fourth day, but England did not appeal against it. Yardley wanted to bat now in poor visibility to erase the deficit and build a lead, to force Australia to chase a target on an erratic surface if a shower came later and turned the pitch into a sticky wicket. Bradman thought that rain might come, so he utilised Toshack and Johnson to bowl defensive leg theory so England would not be in the lead should a sticky wicket arise. As the umpires were obliged to not call off play unless the light was so poor as to endanger the batsman, the lack of pace of Johnson and Toshack forced play to continue as they posed no physical threat to the batsmen.

In his first over at the start of the day, Johnson extracted sharp turn from one delivery that pitched outside off stump; not expecting much spin, Compton did not play a shot and was hit on the pads, but the umpire rejected the loud appeal for lbw. Otherwise, Len Hutton and Compton progressed steadily, although Johnson and Toshack were able to make the ball deviate regularly.

Soon after reaching his century during the afternoon, Compton edged to the slips from the bowling of Miller, but Johnson spilled the catch. Compton went on to make 184 and England were eventually out for 441 on the final day. Johnson sent down 42 overs for a return of 1/66. He had the best economy rate of 1.57 runs per over, ahead of Toshack's 1.81; Bradman used both in a defensive manner. This left Australia a target of 98, which they reached with eight wickets to spare.

Between Tests, Johnson played in the match against Northamptonshire, which started the day after the First Test. He took three middle-order wickets and ended with 3/13 from 13 overs, the most economical figures among the Australians in the first innings, as the hosts were out for 119. He made only four in the bat and took 1/46 in the second innings as Australia cruised to an innings victory. After playing in seven consecutive matches comprising 21 days of cricket between 22 May and 18 June, Johnson was rested for the second match between Tests, which was a draw against Yorkshire.

Second Test

Australia opted to field an unchanged team for the Second Test at Lord's and elected to bat first after winning the toss. Johnson came in at 5/216 on the first afternoon and struggled to score, making only four of the 30 runs added during his stay at the crease before falling at 7/246, caught behind from the bowling of Bill Edrich. However, Australia's lower order wagged and they eventually took the score to 350 on the second morning.

After lunch, Hutton rocked onto the front foot, played outside a Johnson off break and was bowled for 20 to leave England at 2/32. The English opener had been uncertain against Johnson's spin and played forward too early at a slower ball, which went between a gap between his bat and pad. Later in the afternoon, Denis Compton and captain Norman Yardley played Johnson cautiously but safely; in particular, Yardley repeatedly driving a series of overpitched balls from Johnson for runs. Johnson took the last two wickets to fall on the second day, having Alec Coxon caught and bowled for 19 and Laker caught behind for 28 after the pair had put on 41. England were out early on the third morning for 215. Johnson ended with 3/72, having sent down 35 overs, the most by any Australian.

The weather was fine as Australia started their second innings just after noon on the third day. Australia batted strongly and on the fourth day, Johnson came in at 6/445, with Australia already ahead by 580. He made nine before his partner Ray Lindwall was stumped, which prompted Bradman to declare at 7/460. This left England a victory target of 596, which would require a world record run chase.

Further showers forced a rain break immediately after England started their runchase and breathed extra life into the pitch. When the players returned, Lindwall and Johnston extracted steep bounce with the new ball, troubling the English batsmen.

Hutton and Washbrook took the score to 42—England's highest opening partnership of the series—before the former edged Lindwall to Johnson in the slips and was out for 13. Soon after, Edrich edged to Johnson low down in the cordon and England were 2/52. Edrich decided to stand his ground after the catch was taken, thinking he may have hit a bump ball into the ground, but the umpire thought otherwise and ruled him out. Johnson had little else to do as the pacemen made steady progress on a seaming pitch. He bowled only two overs for three runs as England fell for 186, handing Australia victory by 409 runs and a 2–0 series lead.

The next match was against Surrey and started the day after the Test. Johnson was rested as Australia completed a ten-wicket win.

Johnson returned for the following match against Gloucestershire before the Third Test. Australia batted first and reached 7/774 declared, its highest score of the tour, which underpinned a victory by an innings and 363 runs. Johnson made 27, after coming in at 6/669 and playing a supporting role in a 105-run partnership with Sam Loxton, who made 159 not out. Acting captain Hassett declared without further addition to the score after Johnson fell at 7/774. Johnson played a leading role with the ball, taking his only ten-wicket match haul for the tour. After the hosts' openers had put on 74, Johnson removed both in quick succession to leave Gloucestershire at 2/79. He later took the last three wickets as Gloucestershire collapsed from 6/257 to be all out for 269. Johnson had totalled 6/68 from 31.4 overs. Hassett elected to enforce the follow on and the home side reached 2/72 before Johnson took five of the last eight wickets to help end the innings for 132. Johnson ended with 5/32 from 17.1 overs for a match total of 11/100. Johnson took his 50th wicket for the tour during the fixture and was on 57 by the end of the game, the 18th of 31 first-class matches on the tour.

Third Test

The teams reassembled at Old Trafford for the Third Test. Australia dropped Bill Brown, their reserve opener, who had batted out of position in the middle order and scored 73 runs at 24.33 in three Test innings. Brown was replaced by the all rounder Sam Loxton; the move had an unexpected impact on Johnson's playing role during the Test.

Yardley won the toss and elected to bat. England consolidated their innings after falling to 2/28. The hosts were content to score slowly and regroup, and Johnson's first ten overs before lunch yielded only seven runs. However, when Johnson was bowling his second spell after lunch, Jack Crapp hit three driven boundaries in quick succession. Crapp was eager to use his feet to get to the pitch of Johnson's deliveries, and subsequently dealt with the spin fairly comfortably, whereas many of his compatriots stood in their crease and found matters much more difficult. Crapp's counter-attack prompted Bradman to take the second new ball and remove Johnson with the score at 2/96. England then lost three quick wickets to the pacemen to be 5/119. Soon after, Yardley lofted Ernie Toshack—who was bowling leg theory—into the on-side and Johnson caught him for 22 at forward square leg to leave England at 6/141. Soon after, Compton, the last of the specialist batsmen, nearly departed when he leaned forward to a leg-side delivery from Johnson. He overbalanced and stumbled forwards, and Tallon removed the bails. There were no television replays to assist the umpires in those days, and although the attempted stumping appeared close to the naked eye, the benefit of the doubt was given to the batsman and the appeal rejected.

On the second morning, English tail-ender Dick Pollard came to the crease and pulled a ball from Johnson into the ribs of Australian opener Sid Barnes, who was standing at short leg. Barnes stood closer than most in this position—almost on the edge of the cut strip—and was unable to evade the ball. He "dropped like a fallen tree", and had to be carried from the ground by four policemen and taken to hospital for an examination. England eventually reached 363 after Johnson had sent down 38 overs and conceded 77 runs without success. With Barnes injured and Brown dropped, Arthur Morris was the only opener available, so Johnson was deployed as his makeshift partner. He had never opened at Test level, but had once batted at No. 3 when used as a nightwatchman after the fall of the first wicket late on a day's play. Journalist and former Australian Test leg spinner Bill O’Reilly criticised the use of Johnson as an opener, as vice-captain Lindsay Hassett had transformed himself into a defensive batsman with little backlift and a guarded approach, traits that were typical of an opener. Johnson made only one, exposing Bradman to the new ball. Although Australia struggled, they eventually avoided the follow on and ended on 221.

England came out for their second innings, and with Bradman predominantly reliant on his seamers, Johnson bowled only seven overs on the third afternoon as the hosts closed at 3/174 from 69 overs. Late in the day, Johnson dropped Washbrook in the slips cordon from the bowling of Toshack when the batsman was on 80. Washbrook reached stumps unbeaten on 85, and Johnson's miss only cost five runs, as the fourth day was washed out and England declared without further batting after rain delayed the start on the final day. Johnson ended with 0/16 from seven overs.

Play began after the tea break, and Australia needed to score 317 in the last session if they wanted victory. The pitch played very slowly due to the excess moisture, which meant the ball slowed significantly upon hitting the ground surface. As Australia were not looking to chase the runs, there was no need for run-saving fieldsmen, so Yardley often had seven men in close catching positions. In the first half-hour, Australia showed little attacking intent and scored only six runs. Jack Young replaced Pollard and Johnson immediately swept him for four, before edging the next ball to Crapp and falling for six to leave Australia at 1/10. Australia batted for another two hours without further loss, to reach 1/92 from 61 overs before the match was finally ended after a series of periodic rain interruptions. Johnson had an unhappy game, scoring only seven runs in two innings, dropping a catch and taking match figures of 0/93.

After the Test, Johnson was rested for Australia's victory over Middlesex by ten wickets; it was their only county match between Tests.

Fourth Test

The teams headed to Headingley for the Fourth Test with Barnes still unfit. Australia made two changes for the Test. Middle-order batsman Neil Harvey came in for Barnes, while Ron Saggers replaced Don Tallon—who had a finger injury—behind the stumps. Brown was not recalled to open with Morris; instead, Hassett was promoted from the middle-order to open with Morris, while the teenaged Harvey came into the middle-order. Australia thus jettisoned the experiment of opening the batting with Johnson, who had managed only one and six in the previous Test.

England won the toss and elected to bat on an ideal batting pitch that was predicted to be unhelpful for fast bowling. Thirty minutes before tea, England brought up their 150 without loss, and continued unhindered after two brief interruptions due to rain. Up to this point, the Australian bowling had been loose and inaccurate. Bradman brought on Johnson, who had delivered only three overs so far, the rest of the proceedings having been through fast bowlers. Seeking to stem the flow of runs, Bradman gave Johnson a ring field with no slip. Johnson bowled two consecutive maidens, but Washbrook was scoring freely at the other end, so Bradman called for the new ball and brought back the fast bowlers. Johnson was still wicketless when England closed the day at 2/268. Former Australian Test batsman Jack Fingleton accused Australia of going "progressively downhill" and regarded their performance as their worst day of bowling since World War II, citing the proliferation of full tosses.

The next morning, England progressed strongly. Nightwatchman Alec Bedser hit three consecutive fours from Toshack, prompting Bradman to replace him with Johnson. Bedser surveyed Johnson's wares for one over before hitting him into the leg side three times in the next, yielding a six and two fours. Bradman responded by removing Johnson from the attack. When the off spinner came back, Edrich hit him for another six to reach 96. However, Johnson soon had his revenge. England reached 2/423 when Bedser was out caught and bowled by Johnson, patting the ball back to the bowler when he could have hit it decisively. His on-drive was intercepted by the bowler, who dived across the pitch to his right-hand side to complete the catch. This ended a 155-run third-wicket partnership. Edrich attempted to pull a Johnson long hop to the leg side, targeting the large gap between square leg and mid-on, but only ballooned the ball to Morris, who completed the catch diving forwards at wide mid-on. This came only three runs after Bedser's dismissal and left the score at 4/426. Johnson's two wickets brought two new batsmen were to the crease and precipitated a collapse that saw England dismissed for 496. Johnson ended with 2/89 from 33 overs and was the least economical of the frontline bowlers except Toshack, who broke down with a knee injury.

On the third afternoon, Johnson came to the crease at 5/294 in Australia's first innings when Harvey departed for 112, but he made only 10 before falling at 6/329. Lindwall replaced him and made 77 as Australia's tail pushed the score to 458 on the fourth morning, reducing the deficit to 38. In the second innings, the English batsmen continued to attack Johnson. Given Johnson's lack of economy in the first innings, Bradman declined to use him for the entirety of the first session of the fourth day. When Johnson was introduced after lunch, he was targeted, and Washbrook and Hutton both lofted him for sixes in quick succession, prompting Bradman to remove him from the attack. When Johnson returned, Hutton again hit him in the air, but this time Bradman took a running catch to dismiss the batsman for 57, leaving England at 2/129. Edrich and Compton came in and were initially pinned down, but after 45 minutes, Compton charged Johnson and heaved a delivery to the leg side for a boundary. Bradman promptly took the new ball as England reached 2/209 at tea. After the break, England continued to target Johnson. Edrich hit Johnson for three consecutive fours before lofting a fourth into the crowd for six. Compton took risks against Johnson, successfully cutting against the spin several times, and Bradman was forced to use a well-spread field to cut down the fast scoring off Johnson. England reached 2/232 before collapsing to be 8/362 at the end of the day, but Johnson was not responsible for any of these wickets.

England batted on for five minutes on the final morning, adding three runs in two overs before Yardley declared at 8/365. Johnson ended with 1/85 from 21 overs and was the most uneconomical of the Australian bowlers, conceding runs at a rate of 4.04 per over while the others averaged 3.26. Batting into the final day allowed Yardley the right to ask the groundsman to use a heavy roller, which would help to break up the wicket, make it more likely to spin and therefore more difficult for Australia to bat on.

This left Australia a target of 404 runs for victory. At the time, this would have been the highest ever run-chase to result in a Test victory for the batting side. Australia had only 345 minutes to reach the target, but they scored the runs with 15 minutes to spare and seven wickets in hand, sealing the series 3–0.

After bowling 54 overs at Headingley, Johnson was rested as Australia defeated Derbyshire by an innings in a match that started the day after the Fourth Test. He bowled the most overs upon his return in the following match against Glamorgan, a rain-affected draw that did not reach the second innings. Johnson sent down 28.4 overs and took 3/58 as the hosts were bowled out for 197; Australia reached 3/215 when the weather ended the match.

Johnson was the most economical Australian in the first innings of the game against Warwickshire. He took 3/29 from 22.3 overs as the hosts fell for 138, before making an unbeaten 13 at No. 9 as Australia struggled to 254 in reply. He was given a solitary maiden over in the second innings before Australia won by nine wickets. Australia then faced and drew with Lancashire for the second time on the tour. Johnson came to the crease at 6/202 after Bradman's men had suffered a middle-order collapse of 3/8. He made 48 as the Australian lower order wagged to push the score to 321. Johnson was given a light bowling load in the first innings, sending down only five overs, but he removed three of the last four wickets to end with 3/5 as the hosts fell for 130. He did not bat in the second innings and took 1/30 as the home side managed to hang on with seven wickets down. In the non-first-class match against Durham, a rain-affected draw that did not reach the second innings, Johnson came in at 7/212 and made 44 to help Australia recover to 282 and took 1/2 from three overs as the hosts reached 5/73 when rain ended the match after the first day.

Fifth Test

Australia travelled to The Oval for the Fifth Test. After taking only seven wickets at 61.00 in the four Tests, and being severely attacked in the previous match at Headingley, Johnson was dropped in favour of leg spinner Doug Ring. Yardley won the toss and elected to bat on a rain-affected pitch. England were dismissed for 52 in 42.1 overs on the first afternoon with Ring not required to bowl, as the pacemen made light work of the hosts. Ring was economical in the second innings, taking 1/44 from 28 overs as Australia sealed the series 4–0 with another innings victory.

Later tour matches
Seven matches remained on Bradman's quest to go through a tour of England without defeat. Johnson returned and made 15 of 361 as Australia batted first against Kent. Johnson was not asked to bowl as the first four bowlers used cut down the hosts' first innings for 51 in just 23 overs. It was a similar tale in the second innings after Australia enforced the follow on. The pacemen did the early damage and Johnson bowled only briefly, sending down 4.5 overs and removing the last two batsmen to end with 2/15 as the hosts fell for 124 in 32.5 overs to seal another Australian victory by an innings in two days. In the next match against the Gentlemen of England, Johnson did not bat before Australia declared at 5/610 against a team featuring eight Test players. When the tourists bowled, Johnson took three consecutive wickets to reduce the hosts from 1/76 to 4/121. He ended with 4/60 from 23 overs as the Gentlemen made 245. Johnson's victims included Donnelly, future England opener Reg Simpson and former England captain Walter Robins. Bradman enforced the follow on, and Johnson took the last three wickets to end with 3/69 from 28.5 overs, including the scalps of Robins and Test player Freddie Brown. This completed another innings victory for the tourists. Johnson broke through for his first century of the tour in the next match against Somerset. Australia batted first and Johnson came in at No. 6 with the score at 4/306 to join Ron Hamence, who was also looking for his first ton of the season. The pair put on 195 runs, before Hamence fell at the closest possible point to his century, stumped for 99. Miller came out and helped Johnson add another 59 before Australia declared at 5/560, with the latter undefeated on 113. Following his innings, Johnson only bowled 10 overs in taking 1/19 for the match. The hosts were bowled out twice for a combined total of 186 from a sum of just 81.3 overs as Australia enforced the follow on and won by an innings and 374 runs. Johnson was rested for the fixture against the South of England. Australia declared at 7/522 and bowled out the hosts for 298 when rain ended the match.

Australia's biggest challenge in the post-Test tour matches was against the Leveson-Gower's XI. During the last Australian tour in 1938, this team was effectively a full-strength England outfit, but this time Bradman insisted only six current Test players be allowed to play for the hosts. After his opponents complied with the demand, Bradman fielded a full-strength team, the only difference from the Fifth Test team being Johnson's return at the expense of Ring. The bowlers skittled the hosts for 177 and Johnson took 3/45, his victims being Donnelly, Yardley and former Test batsman Laurie Fishlock. Johnson also caught Brown and Laker from the bowling of Lindwall. Johnson made 38 as Australia declared at 8/469 in reply. The hosts were 2/75 in their second innings when the match ended in a draw after multiple rain delays. Johnson took both wickets,—the batsman being Hutton and Fishlock—ending with 2/12.

The tour ended with two non-first-class matches against Scotland. Johnson made a duck in Australia's first innings of 236 in the first match. He then bowled a total of 17 overs and took 3/26 as Australia won by an innings. In the second match, Johnson took 3/26 from 20.2 overs in the first innings as Scotland made 178. He was promoted to No. 5 and came in at 3/96 to hit 95 as Australia reached 6/407 declared. In the second innings, Johnson was unable to add a wicket in his final opportunity for the tour, taking 0/6 from three overs. However, when it became clear Australia was in an unassailable position, Bradman allowed wicket-keeper Don Tallon to bowl, and he took 2/15. In the meantime, Johnson deputised with the gloves and he completed a stumping from the leg spin of Ring as Australia finished the tour with another innings victory.

Role 

An off spinner, Johnson was a member of Bradman's first-choice team, playing in four of the five Tests before being dropped for the final rubber. He also played in the matches against Worcestershire, the MCC and Leveson-Gower's XI, where Australia selected their strongest possible team. However, Johnson was not prominent in the Test success, taking seven wickets at 61.00, his best result being 3/72 in the first innings of the Second Test. Among the five frontline bowlers used in four or more Tests, Lindwall, Miller, Toshack, Johnston and Johnson, the last had the worst average by a factor of almost two; Toshack averaged 33.09 and the others less than 23.50. Lindwall and Johnston took 27 wickets each, while Miller and Toshack took 13 and 11 respectively. Johnson's economy rate was the second worst of the quintet and his strike rate of 156.86 was more than twice as bad as the others, with the exception of Toshack (94.46). Johnson also had little impact with the bat, scoring 51 runs at 10.20, but he did take five catches in the slips.

Johnson had more success in the tour matches, taking 85 wickets at 18.37 in all first-class matches. This placed him third in the wicket-taking and fifth in the averages among the Australians. In the first-class matches excluding the Tests, Johnson was the leading wicket-taker. He bowled more overs than anyone but Johnston, allowing Bradman to ease the workload on his pace spearheads Lindwall and Miller, allowing them to conserve energy ahead of the Tests. Johnson's most successful game with the ball was against Gloucestershire, which yielded match figures of 11/100. Like his bowling, Johnson's batting was also more successful outside of the Tests, scoring 543 runs at 30.16 in 22 innings, with a top-score of 113 not out against Somerset and an 80 against a MCC team that consisted almost entirely of Test players. Johnson usually batted at No. 7 or No. 8, although he was notably used as a makeshift opener in the Third Test and scored an aggressive 74 at No. 3 in the run-chase against Hampshire.N- Johnson was prominent in the field, taking 23 catches, the most by a non-wicket-keeper on tour. He usually fielded in the slips.

Wisden Cricketers' Almanack noted that while Johnson had started the tour well, he was not as effective in English conditions as on his home pitches in Australia.

Notes

Statistical note

n-[1]

This statement can be verified by consulting all of the scorecards for the matches, as listed here.

General notes

References 

 

The Invincibles (cricket)